Daniel James Poliziani (born March 5, 1959) is a Canadian ice hockey coach. He is currently an associate coach for the York University Lions Men's Ice Hockey team.

Poliziani played as a Centre with the Yale Bulldogs, New Haven Nighthawks, Saginaw Gears, Fort Wayne Komets, Kalamazoo Wings, and Dundas-Hamilton Tigers. Poliziani was an assistant coach with the Yale Bulldogs from 1984–95 and was the interim head coach of the Bulldogs during the 1993–94 season, while regular head coach Tim Taylor coached the United States Olympic Team. Additionally, Poliziani was head coach with both the North York Rangers from 1998–99 and Appleby Bluedogs from 2002-14.

Playing career statistics

Head coaching record

References

External links

1959 births
Living people
Yale Bulldogs men's ice hockey coaches
Yale Bulldogs men's ice hockey players
Canadian ice hockey centres